HNLMS Noord-Brabant (D810) was a  anti-submarine destroyer of the Royal Netherlands Navy. The ship was from 1955 to 1974 in Dutch service. On 9 January 1974, HNLMS Noord-Brabant was rammed amidships by an English merchant ship. The damage was estimated to be expensive so the Royal Netherlands Navy decided to not repair the damage but instead decommission the ship earlier than planned. The ship's radio call sign was "PAIP".

History
HNLMS Noord-Brabant was one of four s and built at the Koninklijke Maatschappij de Schelde (KMS) in Vlissingen. The keel laying took place on 1 March 1951 and the launching on 28 November 1953. The ship was put into service on 1 June 1955. The Queen's Commissioner Mr. de Quai was present on behalf of the province North Brabant at her commissioning. The first commander of HNLMS Noord-Brabant was LTZ. S. de Boer.

In 1955 she took part in the national Navy days (Vlootweek) afterwards her trials were finished and she would be placed in reserve until  1965. In 1957 Noord-Brabant was briefly taken out of reserve to participate in the festivities around the 350th anniversary of Michiel de Ruyter held at Vlissingen.

In 1966 she would participate in the NATO exercises Sailors Pride and Silent Rain. The next year she participated in the exercises Perfect Play and Wicked Lady. In 1968 she participated in the exercise Silver Tower and a year later in an exercise called Razor Sharp.

Noord-Brabant participated in the exercises Strong Express in 1972 and Quick Save, Sunny Seas and Swift Move in 1973.

Taken out of service
On 9 January 1974 HNLMS Noord-Brabant was on the Westerschelde when a British bulk carrier was on course to ram the Dutch ship, the helmsman of Noord-Brabant tried his best to avoid the ramming. However, it was to no avail since the bulk carrier rammed the ship in the middle section which resulted in a  gap. In the collision two crew members of Noord-Brabant were killed and there were numerous wounded. The destroyer was towed to the ship repair yard Scheldepoort were the damage was deemed to be expensive and the Royal Netherlands Navy deemed it better to decommission the ship early than pay for the repairs. As a result, Noord Brabant was taken out of service early on 8 March 1974.

Notes

References
  Also published as

External links
 Hr. Ms. Noord-Brabant - de onderzeebootjager D 810

Holland-class destroyers
1953 ships
Ships built in Vlissingen
Destroyers of the Cold War